Kurt Vonnegut's God Bless You, Mr. Rosewater is a 1979 musical that marked the first collaboration of composer Alan Menken and writer Howard Ashman. Based on Kurt Vonnegut's 1965 novel of the same name, the musical tells the story of Eliot Rosewater, a millionaire who develops a social conscience and creates a foundation to improve the lives of the citizens of an impoverished Indiana town.

Productions
The musical had a showcase in May 1979 at the WPA Theater in New York City. Directed by Ashman, Frederick Coffin played Eliot Rosewater and Jonathan Hadary played Mushari. Menken played the keyboards.

The musical transferred to the Entermedia Theatre Off-Broadway, where it opened on October 14, 1979 and closed on November 24, after 49 performances. Directed by Ashman, the production featured Frederick Coffin (Eliot Rosewater), Janie Sell (Sylvia Rosewater), and Jonathan Hadary (Norman Mushari).

The musical was produced at the Arena Stage in Washington, D.C. in May to June 1981, again directed by Ashman and starring Coffin. The cast also featured Robert Westenberg, Steve Liebman, Theresa Rabov, and Leslie Cass.

In March 2003, Rosewater was performed in concert as part of the CooperArts series at the Cooper Union; the concert featured Jim Walton (Eliot Rosewater), Carolee Carmello (Sylvia Rosewater), and David Pittu (Norman Mushari).

The New England premiere of the show was performed from April 14–24, 2016 by Cape Cod Community College, in West Barnstable Massachusetts. The cast was made up of primarily students and most had heard of the book (Kurt Vonnegut was a resident of the area) however not many knew that it had been made into a musical.

An Encores! Off-Center staged concert  ran at New York City Center from July 27–30, 2016. The production starred Skylar Astin (Norman Mushari), Santino Fontana (Eliot Rosewater), Brynn O'Malley (Sylvia), and James Earl Jones (Kilgore Trout). The production also featured Rebecca Naomi Jones and was directed by Michael Mayer. This cast recorded the first studio recording of this musical in 2017.

Cast and characters

Musical numbers
Source: CurtainUp

Act I
Overture — Orchestra
The Rosewater Foundation — Rosewater Foundation Office Workers, Eliot, Company
The Rosewater Foundation (Reprise) — Eliot
Dear Ophelia — Eliot
Thank God for the Volunteer Fire Brigade — Firefighters, Eliot, Company
Mushari's Waltz (Magical Moment) — Mushari
Thirty Miles From the Banks of the Ohio/Look Who's Here — Eliot, Rosewater Township Citizens
Cheese Nips — Sylvia, Company
The Rosewater Foundation (Reprise II) — Eliot, Township Citizens
Since You Came to This Town — Rosewater Township Citizens, Company

Act II
A Poem by William Blake — A Voice Not Unlike God's, Company
The Rhode Island Tango — Fred, Caroline, Mushari
Eliot/Sylvia — Eliot, Sylvia
Plain Clean Average Americans — Mushari, Eliot, Caroline, Fred, Company
A Firestorm Consuming Indianapolis — Eliot
Dear Ophelia (Reprise) — Sylvia
I, Eliot Rosewater — Eliot, Company

References

External links

 God Bless You, Mr. Rosewater at the Internet Off-Broadway Database
 God Bless You, Mr. Rosewater at the Music Theatre International website
 "The Making of God Bless You, Mr. Rosewater", a 2016 Playbill oral history

1979 musicals
Off-Broadway musicals
Musicals based on novels
Kurt Vonnegut
Musicals by Alan Menken
Musicals by Howard Ashman
Plays set in Indiana